Ruman Ahmed (born 5 October 1991) is a Bangladeshi cricketer who plays for Sylhet Division since the 2009–10 season.

References

External links
 

1991 births
Living people
Bangladeshi cricketers
Sylhet Division cricketers
Dhaka Division cricketers
Bangladesh under-23 cricketers
Cricketers from Dhaka